Elizabeth Armstrong may refer to:

Elizabeth Armstrong (water polo) (born 1983), American water polo player
Elizabeth Armstrong (artist) (1859–1930), Australian artist and educator
Bess Armstrong (born 1953), American film and television actress
Elizabeth Armstrong (settler), American settler in Illinois
Elizabeth Armstrong Reed (1842–1915), American Oriental scholar
Elizabeth Armstrong (curator), American curator of contemporary and modern art
Izzy Armstrong, Elizabeth Armstrong, fictional character